is a Japanese footballer currently playing as a midfielder for Renofa Yamaguchi FC.

Personal life
Tanaka is the brother of fellow footballer Hiromu Tanaka.

Career statistics

Club

Notes

References

External links

2000 births
Living people
Association football people from Gunma Prefecture
Japanese footballers
Association football midfielders
J1 League players
Vegalta Sendai players
J2 League players
Renofa Yamaguchi FC players